Loki (Boloki), or Ruki, is a Bantu language spoken in the Democratic Republic of the Congo. It is very close to Lingala. The Boloki (Baloki) people are named after the Ruki River; they live on either side of the Congo River where the Ruki joins it.

References

Languages of the Democratic Republic of the Congo
Bangi-Ntomba languages